East Main Street Historic District in Danville, Kentucky is a historic district that was listed on the National Register of Historic Places in 1986.

The district includes part or all of an area originally called "Otter's Addition".  The Reid House is one example of Queen Anne architecture in the district, which was supported by the completion of the Danville railway which then facilitated use of pre-cut architectural woodwork details in construction in the area.

References

National Register of Historic Places in Danville, Kentucky
Queen Anne architecture in Kentucky
Neoclassical architecture in Kentucky
Geography of Boyle County, Kentucky
Historic districts on the National Register of Historic Places in Kentucky
Houses in Boyle County, Kentucky
Neighborhoods in Kentucky
Houses on the National Register of Historic Places in Kentucky